Malchovtsi may refer to the following places in Bulgaria:

Malchovtsi, Gabrovo Province
Malchovtsi, Veliko Tarnovo Province